This list gives an overview of the locomotives and railcars that were in the Prussian state railways. Also included are the locomotives of the Grand Duchy of Hesse State Railways (Grossherzoglich Hessischen Staatseisenbahnen) and the Prussian-Hessian Railway Company (Preussisch-Hessischen Eisenbahngemeinschaft).

Locomotive classification

1883 classification system 

Up to 1 April 1883 the Prussian state railways or acquired private railways designated their locomotives with names and/or numbers. From that date the following numbering scheme was introduced into all the railway divisions.

This scheme applied to all state railway divisions and state-managed private railways. Locomotive numbering was organised according to the above system. However a locomotive could only be identified exactly by using the divisional name and running number in combination.

Because of the increasing numbers of locomotives being procured, the classification scheme and its range of numbers were no longer sufficient. However the numbering system was not immediately replaced. As a result, numbering chaos arose as individual divisions used spare numbers and unique designations for new locomotives.

1903 classification system 

Due to the resulting confusion a new classification scheme was introduced in 1903. This was based on the systems used in the Cologne West Rhine (Coeln linksrheinisch), Elberfeld und Magdeburg railway divisions. This changeover took place between 1905 and 1908 within the divisions.

There were four main groups:
 S – Schnellzuglokomotiven = express train locomotives
 P – Personenzuglokomotiven = passenger train locomotives
 G – Güterzuglokomotiven = goods train (freight) locomotives
 T – Tenderlokomotiven = tank locomotives

An additional number represented the power delivered by the engine and together specified its group. The higher the number the more powerful the locomotive. Engines with a medium power rating were given the number 3. Saturated steam engines were given odd, and superheated steam locomotives even, numbers.

The individual locomotive groups were given a specific range of numbers, that often differentiated between two-cylinder (Zwillings-) and compound locomotives.

Because the group criteria allowed a certain degree of freedom, and because the myriad locomotives were often different, it was possible for the same type of locomotive to be placed in different groups in the different railway divisions.

From 1910 the divisions within the groups were further refined using indices. And as older locomotives were mustered out the groups became largely uniform. As a result, from that time the group designation became simultaneously a class designation. In the margins of this measure, individual locomotive types were redesignated into other groups.

From 1914 the allocation of numbers began to be no longer consistent. This situation became worse after the end of the First World War as a result of the dissolution of the railway divisions as well as the disorganised way in which locomotives were entered into service.

Classification system for technical and engineering purposes 

For technical and engineering purposes, the system introduced in 1883 was not practicable. In order to describe individual types of locomotive a second system was therefore brought in.

This scheme was based on a leading fraction for the running gear ratio, capital letters to specify the primary role and type of steam used, and additional abbreviations for special features.

There were no special abbreviations for wet steam engines, tender locomotives, two-cylinder engines and simple steam expansion.

So 2/4 H. S. L. dr. meant a four-coupled, four axled, superheated express train locomotive with carrying bogie.

Further details such as 'bus' ("Omnibus") were spelt out in full. With the addition of phrases like 'with trailing axle' ("mit hinterer Laufachse") it was possible to distinguish whether a carrying wheelset was in front of or behind the coupled wheels. Following on were further descriptions in order to differentiate the different locomotives. So, for example, the name of the design company, or the name of the railway division that first procured the engine, or the fact that the locomotive was built to certain standards, were added. This classification system continued even after the introduction of the 1903 scheme. From 1910 the detail of the wheel arrangement as a fraction was replaced by a combination of figures for carrying axles and letters for coupled axles (see UIC classification).

Classification of electric locomotives and railbuses 

The first locomotives built from 1908 were given the Class designation "WSL" - Wechselstrom-Schnellzug-Lokomotive (AC express train locomotive) and "WGL" - Wechselstrom-Güterzug-Lokomotive (AC goods train locomotive) as well as operating numbers: from 10201 for the goods train engines and 10501 for the expresses. In addition the name of the railway division followed. Because the system was no longer adequate for the locomotives ordered from 1911 a system was introduced similar to the steam engine classification scheme.

It comprised the class designations:

 ES – Schnellzuglokomotiven = express train locomotives (operating numbers starting at 1)
 EP – Personenzuglokomotiven = passenger train locomotives (operating numbers starting at 201)
 EG – Güterzuglokomotiven = goods train locomotives (operating numbers starting at 501)
 EV – Verschiebelokomotiven = pusher locomotives (operating numbers starting at 1)

Multiple locomotives were designated with lower case letters.

The railbuses were initially only given an operating number. From 1910 type letters were introduced.

 AT – Akkumulatortriebwagen = accumulator railbus (operating numbers starting at 201), later only "A"
 DT – Dampftriebwagen = steam railbus (operating numbers starting at 1)
 VT – Verbrennungsmotortriebwagen = combustion engine railbus (operating numbers starting at 1)
 ET – Elektrotriebwagen = electric railbus (various numbering systems)

There were far more locomotives than available 4-digit numbers; consequently each division had its own list. Locomotives transferred between divisions would be renumbered. The 22 divisions were:

The operating numbers were always given together with their originating railway division in order to avoid any possible confusion.

Remarks about the tables 

The lists give an overview of the locomotives procured by the Prussian state railways (Preussische(n) Staatseisenbahnen) from 1880 or as standard types thereafter.

Steam locomotives

Express train locomotives

Passenger train locomotives

Goods train locomotives

Tank locomotives

Narrow gauge locomotives

Electric locomotives

Railbuses

See also 

History of rail transport in Germany
Länderbahnen
Kingdom of Prussia
 Krauss Locomotive Works
Prussian state railways
UIC classification

References

External links 
 Lokomotiven deutscher Eisenbahnen (Prussian locomotives)

Deutsche Reichsbahn-Gesellschaft locomotives
Defunct railway companies of Germany
Locomotives of Germany

Prussia
Transport in Prussia

pl:Pruska Kolej Wschodnia